This is a complete list of Renfe and Ferrocarrils de la Generalitat de Catalunya-operated railway stations in Barcelona, sorted alphabetically, excluding Barcelona Metro stations. It only includes stations strictly located within the municipality of Barcelona proper (as opposed to the metropolitan area of Barcelona).

Stations

Future stations

Former stations

See also
Transport in Barcelona
List of Rodalies Barcelona railway stations
List of Barcelona Metro stations
List of tram stations in Barcelona

Barcelona
Railway stations